Basketball in the Czech Republic is organized by Czech Basketball Federation (ČBF).

The top professional Czech basketball league is Mattoni National Basketball League. Participating in the competition are 12 clubs and the season lasts 9 months. The current champion is ČEZ Basketball Nymburk (season 2007–2008). The Czech basketball champion participates in FIBA Europe EuroCup, against top teams in FIBA Europe EuroCup Challenge.

The top women's Czech basketball league is Women's Basketball League. There are 10 teams participating in this competition. Current women's champion is Gambrinus Sika Brno (season 2005–2006). Two best teams participate in FIBA Europe Euroleague Women. Gambrinus Brno has won this competition in 2006. Other top teams participate in FIBA Europe EuroCup Women.

The Czech teams also compete in a domestic cup competition each year.

Others Competitions
Czech Cup in men's basketball
Czech Cup in women's basketball

See also
Czech national basketball team
Czech Republic women's national basketball team

External links
(in Czech)
Czech Basketball Federation
Mattoni National Basketball League 2006/07
Women's Basketball League 2006/07